Anil Kaul (born 25 December 1964) is a retired male badminton player from Canada, who won the gold medal in the inaugural men's doubles competition at the 1995 Pan American Games. He did so alongside Iain Sydie. A resident of Victoria, Manitoba, he represented Canada at the 1992 and 1996 Summer Olympics.

Kaul assumed the presidency of Badminton Canada from 1 July 2015, after being elected by the organizations membership on 14 June, replaces Peter Golding.

References

External links
 
 
 
 

1964 births
Living people
Kashmiri people
Indian Hindus
Kashmiri Hindus
Kashmiri Pandits
Kashmiri Brahmins
Sportspeople from Amritsar
Racket sportspeople from Punjab, India
Sportspeople from Manitoba
Indian emigrants to Canada
Canadian people of Indian descent
Canadian people of Kashmiri descent
Canadian Hindus
Canadian male badminton players
Badminton players at the 1992 Summer Olympics
Badminton players at the 1996 Summer Olympics
Olympic badminton players of Canada
Badminton players at the 1995 Pan American Games
Pan American Games gold medalists for Canada
Pan American Games medalists in badminton
Badminton players at the 1990 Commonwealth Games
Commonwealth Games silver medallists for Canada
Commonwealth Games medallists in badminton
Medalists at the 1995 Pan American Games
Medallists at the 1990 Commonwealth Games